The Pipistrel Twister is a Slovenian ultralight trike, designed and produced by Pipistrel of Ajdovščina. It was distributed in Europe by Flight Team UG & Company AG of Ippesheim and sometimes called the Flight Team Twister. The aircraft is supplied as a complete ready-to-fly-aircraft.

By October 2018 it was listed as a "legacy" product and production had ended.

Design and development
The Twister is a development of the Pipistrel Spider. It incorporates a bent main pylon, which allows more seating room for the rear seat occupant, more streamlined main landing gear legs and a Rotax 912 engine. The Twister was designed for competition use, but has been successful in the recreational market as well.

It features a cable-braced hang glider-style high-wing, weight-shift controls, a two-seats-in-tandem open cockpit with a cockpit fairing, tricycle landing gear with wheel pants and a single engine in pusher configuration.

The aircraft is made from welded steel tubing, with its double surface wing covered in Dacron sailcloth. Its  span wing is supported by a single tube-type kingpost and uses an "A" frame weight-shift control bar. The powerplant is a four-cylinder, air and liquid-cooled, four-stroke, dual-ignition  Rotax 912UL engine.

Specifications (Twister 912)

See also
Silence Twister, a different aircraft with the same model name

References

External links

2000s German sport aircraft
2000s German ultralight aircraft
Single-engined pusher aircraft
Ultralight trikes